Marcus Fraser (born 23 June 1994) is a Scottish professional footballer who plays as a defender for Scottish Premiership club St. Mirren.

Career

Celtic
Raised in Bishopbriggs, Fraser joined Celtic when he was eight years old, progressing through the youth ranks signing a three-year professional contract in the summer of 2010. Whilst a member of Celtic's under-19 squad, he was called up to the first team for a friendly match against Athletic Bilbao on 26 March 2011. He made his debut the following season, on 3 November 2011, in a 3–1 win against Rennes in the UEFA Europa League, coming on as a substitute at half time and playing in the centre of defence. Fraser made his first start for Celtic in a Scottish Premier League match against Inverness Caledonian Thistle on 9 February 2013.

On 12 September 2014, Fraser joined Scottish Championship club Cowdenbeath on loan. He was released by Celtic in January 2015.

Ross County
Fraser immediately signed for Ross County. He made his debut for the Highland side on 24 January 2015, in a 1–0 defeat at home to Celtic. On 17 March 2015, Fraser signed a new contract to keep him at Ross County until 2017.
A year later he signed a further two-year extension, keeping him under contract until summer 2019.

In June 2018, after Andrew Davies left the club, Fraser became the new captain; he went on to lift the Scottish Championship and Scottish Challenge Cup as Ross County were promoted back to the Scottish Premiership after being relegated a year earlier.

On 5 June 2020 Fraser rejected a new contract at Ross County and left the club after 5 and a half years and making 195 appearances for the club.

St. Mirren

On 28 July 2020, Fraser signed a one-year deal with St. Mirren. In May 2021, Fraser signed a two-year extension to remain at the club until the summer of 2023.

International

Fraser has represented Scotland at under-16, under-17, under-18, under-19 and under-21 levels.

Career statistics

Honours

Club
Ross County
Scottish League Cup: 2015–16
Scottish Championship: 2018–19
Scottish Challenge Cup: 2018–19

Individual
 PFA Scotland Team of the Year (Championship): 2018–19

References

External links

Ross County profile

1994 births
Living people
Sportspeople from Bishopbriggs
Scottish footballers
Association football central defenders
Celtic F.C. players
Cowdenbeath F.C. players
Ross County F.C. players
St Mirren F.C. players
Scottish Premier League players
Scottish Professional Football League players
Scotland youth international footballers
Scotland under-21 international footballers